Nayakar, Nayakkar, Nayaker or Naicker is a title commonly used in the southern part of India by Kannada, Tamil and Telugu speaking people, sometimes as a surname and in other cases as a caste affiliation. This title was historically bestowed upon vassals and army commanders of the Vijayanagara empire, and is a Dravidianized derivative of the Sanskrit term nāyaka, from nī- ‘to lead’. The title is closely related to Naidu, Nayudu, Nayaka and Nayak.

Notable people with the title include:
 E.V. Ramasami Naicker, commonly known as Periyar
 M. A. Manickavelu Naicker, Former Minister
 Sri Vikrama Rajasinha of Kandy
 Raghunatha Nayak
 Tirumala Nayaka

References

Titles in India
Tamil society
Telugu society